A wig is a false hair piece.

Wig or WIG may also refer to:

Music
 Wig!, a 2010 album by Peter Case
 "Wig" (song), a song by the B-52's
 "Wig", a song by DaBaby featuring Moneybagg Yo (2022)

Other uses 
 WIG, an index of the Warsaw Stock Exchange
 WIGS (web channel), a producer of short online web series with the tagline "Where It Gets..."
 Wigtownshire, historic county in Scotland, Chapman code WIG
 Wing-in-ground-effect vehicle, a type of low-flying plane
  (Polish Military Geographical Institute), a maker of topographic maps from 1919 until 1949
 Women in German, an organization for women in German studies

See also
 Whig (disambiguation)
 The Wig (disambiguation)
 Wig Out (disambiguation)
 Wig-wig
 Wigan (disambiguation)
 Wigg (disambiguation)
 Wigtown, Scotland
 Wigwag (disambiguation)
 Wigwam (disambiguation)